The following lists events that happened during 1889 in New Zealand.

Incumbents

Regal and viceregal
Head of State – Queen Victoria
Governor – The term of Lieutenant-General Sir William Jervois ends on 23 March. The Earl of Onslow takes up the position of Governor on 2 May.

Government and law
The 10th New Zealand Parliament continues.

Speaker of the House – Maurice O'Rorke.
Premier – Harry Atkinson.
Minister of Finance – Harry Atkinson.
Chief Justice – Hon Sir James Prendergast

Parliamentary opposition
Leader of the Opposition – John Ballance (Liberal Party). This is the first year in which there is a recognised opposition leader.

Main centre leaders
Mayor of Auckland – Albert Devore followed by John Upton
Mayor of Christchurch – Charles Louisson
Mayor of Dunedin – Hugh Gourley followed by John Roberts
Mayor of Wellington – John Duthie

Events 
21 January – American "Professor" Baldwin makes the first balloon ascent in New Zealand at Dunedin.
2 December – The S.S. Alice, the first mechanically powered vessel on the Rotorua Lakes, is launched.

Arts and literature
Reputedly the first science fiction novel written by a New Zealander, Anno Domini 2000, or, Woman's Destiny by former Premier Julius Vogel is published.

Sport

Athletics

National Champions, Men
100 yards – T. Lewis (Hawkes Bay)
250 yards – H. Reeves (Canterbury)
440 yards – H. Reeves (Canterbury)
880 yards – P. Cox (Southland)
1 mile – F. Ellis (Hawkes Bay)
120 yards hurdles – Harold Batger (Wellington)
Long jump – Leonard Cuff (Canterbury)
High jump – T. McNaught (Otago)

Chess
National Champion: Arthur Ollivier, of Christchurch

Horse racing

Major race winners
New Zealand Cup – Tirailleur
New Zealand Derby – Scots Grey
Auckland Cup – Leopold
Wellington Cup – Dudu

Lawn bowls

National Champions
Singles – H. Toomer (Canterbury)
Fours – M. Elliott, P. Dow, W. Allnutt and W. Carlton (skip) (Roslyn)

Polo
The Christchurch Polo Club is formed.

Rowing
Coxless pairs and Double sculls are held at the championships for the first time.

National Champions (Men)
Single sculls – T. McKay (Wellington)
Double sculls – Wellington
Coxless pairs – Wellington
Coxed fours – Wellington

Rugby union
Provincial club rugby champions include:
see also :Category:Rugby union in New Zealand

Shooting
Ballinger Belt – Sergeant Parslow (Auckland)

Swimming

Tennis
After this year the mixed doubles championship are not held again held until 1900.

New Zealand championships
Men's singles – P. Fenwicke
Women's singles – E. Gordon
Men's doubles – Richard Harman and Frederick Wilding
Women's doubles – K. Hitchings and E. Gordon
Mixed doubles – Frederick Wilding and E. Gordon

Births
 27 February: Melville Lyons, politician
 19 June: Cora Louisa Burrell, politician (MLC).

Deaths
 26 July: Thomas Gillies, politician
 26 July: Arthur Fulton, engineer 
 10 December: Robert Campbell, politician
 13 December: Sarah Greenwood, artist

See also
List of years in New Zealand
Timeline of New Zealand history
History of New Zealand
Military history of New Zealand
Timeline of the New Zealand environment
Timeline of New Zealand's links with Antarctica

References
General
 Romanos, J. (2001) New Zealand Sporting Records and Lists. Auckland: Hodder Moa Beckett. 
Specific

External links